All or Nothing: Arsenal is an Amazon Original sports docuseries as part of the All or Nothing brand. In the series, English Premier League side Arsenal's progress was charted through their 2021–22 season, in which they were the youngest team in the Premier League.

The series was produced by 72 Films, executive produced by Mark Raphael, Clare Cameron and BAFTA winner John Douglas.

The series was narrated by Academy Award- and BAFTA Award-winning actor Daniel Kaluuya, who was born and grew up in London, and is a lifelong Arsenal supporter.

The first three episodes of the eight-part series were released on 4 August 2022, and further episodes were released on 11 August and 18 August.

Background
In the 2016–17 season, Arsenal won the FA Cup for a record thirteenth time-and a record seventh under Arsène Wenger, who became the most successful manager in the history of the competition, but fell out of the top four in the Premier League for the first time since before Wenger arrived in 1996, finishing fifth to end their 19-year run in the UEFA Champions League. After another unspectacular league season the following year, Wenger departed Arsenal on 13 May 2018, ending a 22-year, trophy–laden association with the club.

Unai Emery was named as the club's new head coach on 23 May 2018. In Emery's first season, Arsenal finished fifth in the Premier League and as runner-up in the UEFA Europa League. On 29 November 2019, Emery was sacked after Arsenal had gone seven games without a win in all competitions, which was their worst run in 27 years; and former player and assistant first-team coach Freddie Ljungberg was appointed as interim head coach.

On 20 December 2019, Arsenal appointed former club captain Mikel Arteta – who was 37 years old then and had never managed before – as the new head coach. The 2019–20 season had been defined by a three-month lull between March and June, caused by the COVID-19 pandemic; and when it returned, it was behind closed doors. Arsenal finished the league season in eighth, their lowest finish since 1994–95, but earned a record-extending 14th FA Cup win on 1 August 2020, helping them qualify for next season's Europa League, and making Arteta the first person to win the FA Cup as both captain and coach of the club. After the Gunners triumphed in the 2020 FA Community Shield, Arteta's title was changed from head coach to manager. On 18 April 2021, Arsenal were announced as a founding club of the breakaway European competition The Super League; they withdrew from the competition two days later amid near-universal condemnation. Arsenal finished the 2020–21 season in eighth place once again, this time not qualifying for a European competition for the first time in 25 years.

Plot

The series features a rollercoaster season for the club. With their three consecutive defeats without scoring a goal to open the 2021–22 Premier League campaign, Arsenal dropped to the bottom of the table, at 20th, which was their worst start to a season for 67 years. Since then, a new look Arsenal started to emerge with several academy graduates and new signings making a major impact. They finished the league season in fifth place with 22 wins, 3 draws and 13 defeats, and qualified for the 2022–23 UEFA Europa League.

Episodes

Cast

Players
In the 2021–22 season, Arsenal were the youngest team in the Premier League with an average starting age of 24 years and 308 days – more than a whole year younger than the next team.

First-team players

The following first-team players make appearances in the docuseries.

Academy players

The following academy players who were substitutes for Arsenal's first team during the 2021–22 season make appearances in the docuseries.

Non-playing staff
Coaching and medical staff

Note: Age as of 1 July 2021

Management team

Note: Age as of 1 July 2021

Other
Former players

Note: Age as of 1 July 2021

Entertainers

Note: Age as of 1 July 2021

Production
It was first announced on 9 July 2021 that Arsenal would be the subject of the Amazon Prime All or Nothing series, following similar projects with two English football clubs – Manchester City and Tottenham Hotspur. It was reported that Arsenal received around £11 million for the docuseries filmed in the 2021–22 season.

The series was produced during the COVID-19 pandemic. The documentary production crew were given access to the club to provide a behind-the-scenes look at the club. The goings-on at the club were captured by cameras and microphones at the Emirates Stadium and the Arsenal Training Centre. When the team were playing away, video footage was captured by a camera crew following the team.

Release
The official teaser was released on 28 June 2022. The official full trailer was released on 19 July. Six official clips were released on 27 July, 2 August, 9 August, 10 August, 17 August, and 18 August, respectively.

The first screening of the docuseries was at Islington Assembly Hall in Islington, London on 2 August 2022.

The first three episodes were released on 4 August 2022, one day before the start of the 2022–23 Premier League season. Episode 4 to 6 were released on 11 August. The last two episodes were released on 18 August.

References

External links
 
 
 

Arsenal
Arsenal F.C. mass media
Association football documentary television series
Amazon Prime Video original programming
Television series by Amazon Studios
2022 British television series debuts
2022 British television series endings